Bounded growth occurs when the growth rate of a mathematical function is constantly increasing at a decreasing rate. Asymptotically, bounded growth approaches a fixed value. This contrasts with exponential growth, which is constantly increasing at an accelerating rate, and therefore approaches infinity in the limit.

An example of bounded growth is the logistic function.

References

Sources 
 Kuhn, Moscibroda, and Wattenhofer, "On the Locality of Bounded Growth", ACM Symposium on Principles of Distributed Computing (PODC), July 17–20, 2005.

Mathematical modeling